Algernon Darius Crumpler (born December 23, 1977) is an American former professional football player who was a tight end in the National Football League (NFL) for ten seasons. He was drafted by the Atlanta Falcons in the second round of the 2001 NFL Draft. He played college football for North Carolina. Crumpler now works as an analyst for the ACC Network.

Crumpler also played for the Tennessee Titans and New England Patriots. He is a  four-time Pro Bowl selection.

Early years
Crumpler attended New Hanover High School in Wilmington, North Carolina and was a letterman in football and track and field. In football, he started as a tight end and as a linebacker, and as a senior, he was an All-Midwest 4-A Conference selection. In track & field, he was a three-time State Champion on the discus, and won a State Championship on the shot put in 1996. He graduated from high school in 1996.

College career
After graduating from high school, Crumpler attended the University of North Carolina at Chapel Hill. During his last three seasons with the Tar Heels, Crumpler was named to the All-ACC first-team. As a sophomore, Crumpler caught 24 passes for a total of 278 yards, with four of those catches being touchdowns. In his junior season, Crumpler had 20 catches for 191 yards. His senior season concluded with him amassing 23 catches for 287 yards and one touchdown and he finished second in All-American voting.

Professional career

Pre-draft measurables

Atlanta Falcons
Crumpler was drafted by the Falcons in the second round (35th overall) of the 2001 NFL Draft. Crumpler made the first start of his NFL career against the Carolina Panthers on September 23, 2001. He caught his first two passes for a total of 13 yards. His first touchdown was scored against the New Orleans Saints, on October 21, 2001. He finished his rookie season starting 12 of 16 games and totaling 25 receptions for 330 yards and three touchdowns. In 2002, Crumpler started 9 of 16 games, recording 36 receptions for 455 yards and five touchdowns.

Crumpler earned his first Pro Bowl honor in 2003, starting all 16 games for the Falcons, catching 44 passes for 552 yards, the most for a Falcons tight end since 1980; he also had three touchdowns. Crumpler played in and started 14 games for the Falcons in 2004, who advanced to the NFC Championship Game. Crumpler finished the regular season with 48 receptions for 774 yards and six touchdowns and was elected to the Pro Bowl. In 2005, Crumpler returned to start 16 games for the Falcons, setting career highs with 65 receptions for 877 yards, as well as five touchdowns. He was also named to his third-consecutive Pro Bowl.

In 2006, Crumpler set a career-high with eight touchdowns, while also making 56 catches for 780 yards in 16 games started. Crumpler made 10 starts in 14 games in 2007, in his first season without Michael Vick at quarterback. He finished the year with 42 receptions for 444 yards and five touchdowns. In December 2007, Crumpler was fined by the NFL for wearing black eye strips during a Monday Night Football which had the letters MV and the number 7 written on them in support of Vick, who was in prison at the time.

On February 15, 2008, Crumpler was released by the Falcons.

Tennessee Titans
On March 2, 2008, Crumpler signed with the Tennessee Titans. He made his debut with the team on September 7, 2008 against the Jacksonville Jaguars. He started 15 games for the Titans in 2008, making 24 catches for 257 yards. In the Titans' Divisional Playoff game against the Baltimore Ravens, Crumpler fumbled after a reception from Kerry Collins on the Ravens' 5-yard line, which helped the Ravens ultimately win the game over the top-seeded Titans.

On August 9, 2009 in the Titans' first preseason game, Crumpler weighed approximately 300 pounds, gaining an estimated 30 pounds during the offseason. However, Crumpler played in all 16 games for the Titans in 2009, starting 14 and catching 27 passes for 222 yards and one touchdown. He was also part of a blocking unit that aided Titans running back Chris Johnson in a 2,006-yard rushing season.

New England Patriots
On March 24, 2010, Crumpler signed with the New England Patriots. After running back Kevin Faulk, an offensive captain, was lost for the season with a knee injury in Week 2, the team named Crumpler an offensive captain prior to their Week 6 game. The next day, head coach Bill Belichick lauded Crumpler's professionalism:

Crumpler finished the 2010 season with six receptions for 52 yards and two touchdowns in 16 games played (10 starts).

On July 29, 2011, the Patriots announced that Crumpler had been released.

Personal life
He is the son of East Carolina University Athletics Hall of Fame inductee (1980) and North Carolina Sports Hall of Fame inductee (2002) Carlester Crumpler Sr. and younger brother of former Seattle Seahawks and Minnesota Vikings tight end Carlester Crumpler. Alge is named after his father's favorite book, Flowers for Algernon.

References

External links
New England Patriots bio
Tennessee Titans bio

1977 births
Living people
Sportspeople from Greenville, North Carolina
Players of American football from North Carolina
American football tight ends
National Conference Pro Bowl players
North Carolina Tar Heels football players
Atlanta Falcons players
Tennessee Titans players
New England Patriots players
Sportspeople from Wilmington, North Carolina
New Hanover High School alumni
African-American players of American football
21st-century African-American sportspeople
20th-century African-American sportspeople
Ed Block Courage Award recipients